Troy is a city in Madison County, Illinois, United States. The population was 10,960 at the 2020 census, up from 9,888 in 2010.

Troy is part of the St. Louis Metropolitan Statistical Area. Its namesake in Lincoln County, Missouri, is also part of this MSA, making it (along with the two O'Fallons in Illinois and Missouri) one of the few pairs of like-named municipalities to be part of the same MSA.

History
Troy was platted in 1819. It was incorporated as a town on February 18, 1857, and as a city in 1892.

Geography
Troy is located in south-central Madison County at  (38.729236, -89.891733). It is bordered to the west by Maryville and to the northwest by Glen Carbon.

Interstates 55 and 70 pass through the west side of Troy, with access from exits 17 and 18. The highways together lead southwest  to St. Louis, while diverging just north of Troy: I-55 leads north  to Springfield, the state capital, while I-70 leads east  to Vandalia. U.S. Route 40 passes through the south side of Troy, joining I-55 and I-70 at the western edge of the city and leading east  to Highland. Illinois Route 162 passes through the center of Troy as Center Street, Market Street, and Edwardsville Road, leading east  to US 40 and west  to the north part of Maryville.

Most of the city drains eastward into tributaries of Silver Creek, a south-flowing tributary of the Kaskaskia River. The westernmost part of the city drains to Canteen Creek, which flows southwest to the Mississippi River valley at East St. Louis.

Demographics

At the 2000 census there were 8,524 people in 3,100 households, including 2,356 families, in the city. The racial makeup of the city was 95.48% White, 1.48% African American, 0.32% Native American, 0.70% Asian, 0.38% from other races, and 1.64% from two or more races. Hispanic or Latino of any race were 1.49%.

Of the 3,100 households 45.2% had children under the age of 18 living with them, 60.1% were married couples living together, 12.5% had a female householder with no husband present, and 24.0% were non-families. 19.5% of households were one person and 6.8% were one person aged 65 or older. The average household size was 2.75 and the average family size was 3.16.

The age distribution was 30.2% under the age of 18, 8.6% from 18 to 24, 34.3% from 25 to 44, 19.2% from 45 to 64, and 7.7% 65 or older. The median age was 33 years. For every 100 females, there were 96.0 males. For every 100 females age 18 and over, there were 91.5 males.

The median household income was $53,720 and the median family income  was $59,643. Males had a median income of $41,705 versus $27,542 for females. The per capita income for the city was $21,174. About 2.1% of families and 3.4% of the population were below the poverty line, including 3.4% of those under age 18 and 4.5% of those age 65 or over.

Notable people 

 Paul Simon, US senator; lived in Troy and was the youngest editor of the town's newspaper (Troy Tribune)
 Jesse L. Simpson, Chief Justice of the Illinois Supreme Court; born in Troy
 Bob Turley, Cy Young Award-winning pitcher for the St. Louis Browns, Baltimore Orioles, New York Yankees, Los Angeles Angels, and Boston Red Sox; born in Troy

References

External links

Triad Community Schools Unit District #2
Tri-Township Public Library
Troy Chamber of Commerce

Cities in Madison County, Illinois
Cities in Illinois
Populated places established in 1819
1819 establishments in Illinois